A Good Day may refer to:

 A Good Day (Jessica Molaskey album), 2003
 A Good Day (Priscilla Ahn album), 2008
 "A Good Day", a song by Billy Ray Cyrus from his 2009 album Back to Tennessee 
 "A Good Day", a season six episode of The West Wing
 "A Good Day", a song by Timothy B. Schmit from his 2009 album Expando

See also
 Good Day (disambiguation)
 "A Good Night", a 2018 song by John Legend featuring BloodPop